Haisterbach is a village in Erbach im Odenwald, Germany.  im hessischen Odenwaldkreis. It also incorporates the hamlet of Marbach.

It was first mentioned in 1353. In 1939 the village had a population of 232.

The bus line 34 of the Odenwald-Regional-Gesellschaft (OREG) serves this village. It could also be reached via the Bundesstraße 45.

Names 
The name has changed over the years:
 Heysterbuch (1353)
 Heisterbuch (1414)
 Hesterbuch (1434)
 Heysterbuch (1443)
 Heisterbach (1484)

External links 
 Infos auf der Homepage der Stadt Erbach
 Ortslexikon von Hessen

Villages in Hesse